Gor-E-Shahid Baro Maidan is a Eidgah located in Dinajpur, Bangladesh. It is the largest in Bangladesh.

History
In 2017, during Eid ul Adha, this Eidgah hosted the largest jamaat in Bangladesh. In 2019, Gor-E-Shahid Baro Maidan hosted the 5th Eid-ul-Fitr congregation at 8:45 am, for 600,000 devotees. Over 500 policemen, in addition to members of other law enforcement agencies, were deployed in and around the Eidgah to ensure security. The 6th Eid-ul-Azha congregation was at Gor-E-Shahid Baro Maidan in 2019, one of the largest Eid congregations in the country, taking place at 8:30 am with the participation of around 4 lakh devotees.

Architecture

Electric lamps were connected to each dome. The Eidgah Minar was constructed entirely of ceramic.

A road was made for devotees on both sides of the field. According to the district administration, the Eidgah has an area of about 22 acres.

References

Eidgahs